The Driftpile First Nation (or the Driftpile Cree Nation) is a Treaty 8 First Nation with a reserve, Drift Pile River 150, located on the southern shore of the Lesser Slave Lake on Alberta Highway 2 in Northern Alberta.  The band has approximately 1200 members.

References 

First Nations governments in Alberta
Cree governments
Northern Alberta